The Axel Johnson Group is a Swedish family-owned company run by the fourth and fifth generation of family owners. It traces its origins to the trading company A. Johnson & Co, founded in 1873. The group consists of four legally and financially independent groups with a common owner, Antonia Ax:son Johnson and her family. In addition, the group has proprietary interests in the British company Spirent plc, listed on the London and New York Stock Exchanges, and in Nordstjernan, which in turn has major interests in other companies, including the listed company NCC.

The four companies in the group are:
 Axel Johnson AB
 Axel Johnson Inc
 Axel Johnson International AB
 Axfast AB

Axel Johnson AB 
Axel Johnson AB is a Swedish family business that builds and develops trade and service businesses in the European market, with a main focus on the Nordic region. Group companies currently comprise Axel Johnson International, Axfood, Dustin, KICKS, Novax, Martin & Servera and Åhléns.

The wholly and partly owned companies in the Axel Johnson AB group have annual sales of approximately SEK 72 billion and some 20,000 employees (2016).

Axel Johnson AB is one of four independent companies in the Axel Johnson Group, together with property company AxFast, holding company Altocumulus and the US company Axel Johnson Inc. In addition, the Axel Johnson Group has an ownership interest in Nordstjernan. The Axel Johnson Group is owned by Antonia Ax:son Johnson (great-granddaughter of company founder Axel Johnson) and her family.

AltoCumulus 
Altocumulus works with asset management and has offices in Stockholm and Luxembourg.

Nordstjernan 
Nordstjernan is a family controlled investment company with active ownership in Nordic companies. Axel Johnson Group ownership in Nordstjernan amounts to six percent.

Axfoundation 
Axfoundation — Antonia Ax: Son Johnson Foundation for Sustainable Development is a detached, non-profit business founded in 1993. Axfoundation works for a more environmentally and socially sustainable society. One of the initiatives that Axfoundation is behind is the establishment and integration initiative, which works for a more open Sweden and increased contacts between new and established Swedes.

Cooperation with colleges and universities 
The company participates in the Stockholm Partner Program School of Economics through contributions to the university of support for research and education. In 2018 launched the School of Business Antonia Ax: son Johnson Tutorial program, in order to promote in-depth learning and dialogue between students and teachers. The program is financed by Axel Johnson group through a donation of SEK 50 million in 2017.

References

External links
 Axel Johnson official website

Companies based in Stockholm